Zheng Shiping, better known by his pen name Yefu or Tujia Yefu, is a Chinese post, essayist, and novelist.

Pen name
According to Yefu's words, his pen name came from a Chinese Common Saying "Shancun Yefu"() from when he worked in the mountainous region in Hubei Province.

Biography
In 1962, Yefu was born in a village in Lichuan County of Enshi Tujia and Miao Autonomous Prefecture, Hubei, China. His grandpa was a direct male-line descendant of chieftain, his grandfather, Liu Jilu, who had graduated from Huangpu Military Academy, was a general and Chiang Kai-shek's bodyguard. After 1949, Yefu's parents stayed in Mainland China. They were cast as rightists, and suffered political persecution. Yefu's grandfather was brought to be persecuted. His grandfather and two aunts committed suicide due to such tough and hopeless life conditions. At the close of the Cultural Revolution in 1978, Yefu entered the Hubei Institute For Nationalities and started writing poetry. In 1982, Yefu organized a literary organization named BoZao Shishe, and used his pen name Yefu or Tujia Yefu to write articles. In 1986, Yefu entered the Chinese Department of Wuhan University, he studied under Yi Zhongtian, organized a literary organization named Houxiandai Shiren Shalong, and published his collection of poems The Wolf Cries In The Night. In 1989, Yefu was arrested for cover the MDC people. In 1995, Yefu was let out of prison, and he set up shop as a bookseller in Beijing.

Works

References

External links

1962 births
Living people
People from Enshi
Writers from Hubei
People's Republic of China poets
People's Republic of China essayists
Poets from Hubei
Chinese male novelists